FUP or Fup may refer to:

 Fair usage policy
 Fair Use Project of Stanford Law School
 Federal Union Party, a political party in Myanmar
 Freshman Urban Program, at Northwestern University, Illinois, United States
Força de Unidade Popular (Popular Unity Force), a Portuguese political party that existed in 1980–2004
Fup, a fictional duck, the protagonist of the 1983 novel Fup by Jim Dodge
 File Utility Program